The Russian Room was a short film shot in New York City in 1997 and released in 1998.  It stars Avery Schreiber and writer Jeff Casper.  Nance McQuigg directed and produced.

The two-character film takes place in the "russian room" of a New York bath house, a particularly hot sauna.

External links

1998 films
Films set in New York City
1990s English-language films